Örencik is a village in the District of Kazan, Ankara Province, Turkey. To differentiate it from the other nearby Örencik village in the District of Kızılcahamam, people in the area call Örencik "Leblebi Örencik" for its production of leblebis, or roasted chickpeas, while calling the other village "Çakmak Örencik."

References

Villages in Kahramankazan District